Vogels is a Dutch metonymic surname meaning "birds". It may refer to:

Frida Vogels (born 1930), Dutch writer
Guillaume Vogels (1836–1896), Belgian painter
Guus Vogels (born 1975), Dutch field hockey goalkeeper and Olympic gold medallist
Henk Vogels (born 1973), Australian professional road bicycle racer
John Vogels (born 1946), Dutch-born Australian politician
Luke Vogels (born 1983), Australian rules footballer in the Australian Football League
Mieke Vogels (born 1954), Flemish politician in the environmentalist party Groen
Werner Vogels (born 1958), Dutch computer scientist, Chief Technology Officer and Vice President of Amazon

See also
De vogels van Holland ("The birds of Holland"), the first Dutch entry in the Eurovision Song Contest 1956

Dutch-language surnames